Annalena McAfee (born c.1952) Annalena is a British children's author and journalist.

Biography 

In 2003 she served as a judge for the Orange Prize for Fiction, the UK's largest annual literary award. She has also been on the panel for The South Bank Show arts awards, the Ben Pimlott Prize for political writing (2005), The Guardian/Penguin photography competition for cover art (2006), the Samuel Johnson prize for non-fiction, and other awards. Literary festivals where she has spoken include Prague (2003) and Hay-on-Wye (2005). In 2008 she served as a judge for the Orwell Prize (for political writing).

McAfee was the editor of The Guardian's review supplement, the Guardian Review, from 1999 until July 2006, when she resigned to pursue a writing career. Before working for The Guardian she was a literary journalist at the Financial Times and theatre critic on the  Evening Standard. She has written a number of children's books, some which have been translated into French, German and Dutch. McAfee has also edited an anthology of literary profiles from The Guardian.

McAfee married the British novelist Ian McEwan in 1997 after having first met him at an interview she conducted for a profile in the Financial Times.

Selected works

Mainstream fiction
 The Spoiler (2011)
 Hame (2017)
 Nightshade (2020)

Youth titles
 All the Way to the Stars
 Busy Baby
 Kirsty Knows Best
 Patrick's Perfect Pet
 The Girl Who Got to No. 1
 Dreamkidz and the Ice Cream that Conquered the World 
 Why Do Stars Come Out at Night?
 The Visitors Who Came to Stay (awarded the Deutscher Jugendliteraturpreis)

References

External links
Guardian Review
Annalena McAfee interview 
Notification of resignation from Guardian Review
Review of The Spoiler, The New York Times, 28 May 2012

1950s births
Living people
English women journalists
English women novelists
British women children's writers
English women non-fiction writers